Darrell Shane Andrews (born August 28, 1971) is a former third baseman in Major League Baseball.  He graduated from Carlsbad New Mexico High School in 1990.  Andrews began his minor-league career in 1990 with the Gulf Coast Expos.  In 1992, he led he South Atlantic League with 25 home runs and 107 walks.
 
From  through , Andrews played for the Montreal Expos (1995–1999), Chicago Cubs (1999–2000) and Boston Red Sox (2002). He batted and threw right-handed.  In a seven-season career, Andrews posted a .220 batting average with 86 home runs and 263 RBI in 569 games played.

Andrews currently resides in Carlsbad, New Mexico with his family.

References

External links

Shane Andrews at Baseball Almanac
Shane Andrews at Baseballbiography.com

1971 births
Living people
Albany Polecats players
American expatriate baseball players in Canada
American expatriate baseball players in Mexico
Baseball players from Dallas
Boston Red Sox players
Carlsbad High School (Carlsbad, New Mexico) alumni
Chicago Cubs players
Gulf Coast Expos players
Harrisburg Senators players
Iowa Cubs players
Major League Baseball third basemen
Memphis Redbirds players
Mexican League baseball players
Montreal Expos players
Ottawa Lynx players
Pawtucket Red Sox players
Rochester Red Wings players
Sumter Flyers players
Tuneros de San Luis Potosí players
West Palm Beach Expos players